Alamo National Bank Building may refer to:

Alamo National Bank Building (316 E. Commerce, San Antonio, Texas), listed on the National Register of Historic Places in Bexar County, Texas
Alamo National Bank Building (105 S. St. Mary's St., San Antonio, Texas), listed on the National Register of Historic Places in Bexar County, Texas